Minuscule 637 (in the Gregory-Aland numbering), α 262 (von Soden), is a Greek minuscule manuscript of the New Testament, on parchment. Palaeographically to the 12th century. The manuscript is lacunose. Formerly it was labeled by 175a and 216p.

Description 

The codex contains the text of the Acts of the Apostles, Catholic epistles, Pauline epistles, on 242 parchment leaves (size ). It is written in two columns per page, 25 lines per page.

The order of books: Acts of the Apostles, Catholic epistles, and Pauline epistles. Epistle to the Hebrews is placed after Epistle to Philemon.

Text 

The Greek text of the codex is a representative of the Byzantine text-type. Kurt Aland placed it in Category V.

History 

The manuscript has been dated by INTF to the 12th century. It was written in Calabria.

The manuscript was added to the list of New Testament manuscripts by Johann Martin Augustin Scholz. It was examined by Andrew Birch. Gregory saw the manuscript in 1886.

Formerly it was labeled by 175a and 216p. In 1908 Gregory gave the number 637 to it.

The manuscript currently is housed at the library of University of Messina (104), at Messina.

See also 

 List of New Testament minuscules
 Biblical manuscript
 Textual criticism

References

Further reading 

 

Greek New Testament minuscules
12th-century biblical manuscripts